Yurina is a feminine given name of Japanese origin. It may refer to:

Yurina Hase (born 1979), Japanese voice actress
Yurina Hiraka (born 1991), Japanese long jumper
Yurina Hirate (born 2001), Japanese idol singer (Keyakizaka46)
Yurina Kumai (born 1993), Japanese idol singer (Berryz Kobo)
Yurina Yamada (born 1996), Japanese ski jumper
 Yurina Kawaguchi (born 1999), Japanese contestant on the South Korean survival show Girls Planet 999

See also
Ludmila Yurina (born 1962), Ukrainian pianist and composer

Japanese feminine given names